Saudi Arabia competed at the 2004 Summer Paralympics in Athens, Greece. The team included six athletes, all of them men, and won no medals.

Sports

Athletics

Men's track

Men's field

Powerlifting

See also
Saudi Arabia at the Paralympics
Saudi Arabia at the 2004 Summer Olympics

References 

Nations at the 2004 Summer Paralympics
2004
Summer Paralympics